ReShonda Tate Billingsley is an American author and journalist.

Career
Billingsley has authored over 50 books and was involved in three anthologies. She writes both adult and teen fiction, as well as nonfiction and has been nominated for the NAACP Image Award for Outstanding Fiction three times throughout her career. Several of Billingsley's books have been optioned for movies; two of which were made into films: Let the Church Say Amen and The Secret She Kept. The film adaptation of her sophomore novel Let the Church Say Amen, directed by Regina King and produced by TD Jakes and Queen Latifah, originally aired on BET. Her novel The Secret She Kept was made into a film that aired on TVOne. 

In 2014, Billingsley co-founded boutique publishing company Brown Girls Books with best-selling author Victoria Christopher Murray. She has also appeared in the stage play Marriage Material by Je'Caryous Johnson.

Billingsley previously worked for NBC affiliate KFOR in Oklahoma City and Fox affiliate KRIV in Houston, Texas as a television reporter/anchor.

Books
Miss Pearly's Girls (Feb. 2022)
A Little Bit of Karma (Sept. 2020)
The Stolen Daughter (July 2019)
The Book in Room 316 (July 2018)
If Only For One Night (w/Victoria Christopher Murray, Jan. 2017)
Seeking Sarah (July 2017)
It Should've Been Me (w/Victoria Christopher Murray Dec. 2015)
The Perfect Mistress (July 2016)
Mama's Boy (July 2015)
What's Done in the Dark (July 2014)
The Motherhood Diaries 2 (May 2014)
A Family Affair (July 2013)
The Motherhood Diaries (May 2013)
The Secret She Kept (July 2012)
Say Amen, Again (July 2011)
A Good Man is Hard to Find (March 2011)
Drama Queens (Nov. 2010)
Holy Rollers (July 2010)
Caught up in the Drama (April 2010)
The Devil is a Lie (July 2009)
"Friends 'Til the End" (Feb. 2009)
Fairweather Friends (Sept 2008)
Getting Even (April 2008)
Can I Get a Witness?  (March 2008)
The Pastor's Wife(Nov. 2007)
Everybody Say Amen  (Jul. 2007)
With Friends Like These (Apr. 2007)
Blessings in Disguise (Feb. 2007)
Nothing But Drama (Nov. 2006)
I Know I've Been Changed (Feb. 2006)
Help! I've Turned Into My Mother (2005)
Let the Church Say Amen (2004)
My Brother's Keeper (2001)
Four Degrees of Heat (anthology) Excerpt: "Rebound"
Have a Little Faith (anthology) Excerpt: "Faith Will Overcome"
Rumor Central
Get Ready For War

Awards
Smithsonian's African American History Makers (2016)
African American Literary Award for Best Christian Fiction for Fortune & Fame (2014) with Victoria Christopher Murray
NAACP Image Award for Outstanding Literature 2012
African American Literary Award for Best Teen Fiction for Drama Queens (2011)
Inductee into the Arkansas Black Hall of Fame (2010)
Rolling Out Magazine′s Top 25 Women of Houston (2009)
Five-time winner of the National Association of Black Journalists "Spirit in the Words"
Let the Church Say Amen named one of Library Journal'''s Best Books 2004 in Christian Fiction
#1 Essence best-selling author
2006 Texas Executive Woman on the Move
Black Writers Alliance Gold Pen Award for best new author (2002)Mama's Boy named one of Library Journal'''s Best Books 2015 in African American Fiction

Personal
Billingsley grew up in Houston, Texas. She is a graduate of the University of Texas and also a member of Alpha Kappa Alpha sorority and Jack and Jill of America. With roots in Arkansas, she is married to Jeffrey Caradine and together, they have five children.

References

External links
Official Website
Audio Interview with Reshonda Tate Billingsley on Urban Reviews

Living people
American women journalists
University of Texas at Austin alumni
Year of birth missing (living people)
21st-century American women